The Puerto Rican moist forests are a tropical moist broadleaf forest ecoregion in Puerto Rico.

Lowland forests
Lowland forests are found throughout the island's coastal lowlands except for the dry southwest. Characteristic tree species include Hymenaea courbaril, Palma de Coroso (Acrocomia media), Nectandra coriacea, and Zanthoxylum martinicense.
Several species are adapted to dry periods by being deciduous or semi-deciduous.

Montane forests
Montane forests cover the Sierra de Luquillo and the higher peaks of the Cordillera Central. Common trees of the Sierra de Luquillo include Cyathea arborea, Prestoea acuminata, Cecropia peltata, and Ocotea species. Weinmannia pinnata, Brunellia comocladifolia, and Podocarpus coriaceus are found in the cloud forests of the highest peaks.

Fauna
Puerto Rican moist forests are home to a variety of endemic animal species such as the critically endangered Puerto Rican amazon (Amazona vittata) and coquís (Eleutherodactylus spp.). Limestone forests are rich in land snail diversity, with many species restricted to small areas.

Ecological processes 
As with most mountainous areas, the forest types change with elevation, exposure and rock type.  Superimposed upon these physical factors are forms of natural disturbance such as landslides and hurricanes that allow light-demanding plant species to regenerate. A study in the Luqillo Mountains found that between 1936 and 1988, there were 46 landslides associated with heavy rain, and these created gaps that allowed ferns such as Dicranopteris pectitnata to proliferate.

Conservation and protected areas
A 2017 assessment found that 406 km2, or 5%, of the ecoregion is in protected areas. Forty-two percent of the unprotected area is still forested. Protected areas include El Yunque National Forest, Cambalache Forest Reserve, Maricao State Forest, Monte Choca State Forest, Río Abajo State Forest, and Toro Negro State Forest. The Northeast Ecological Corridor Nature Reserve includes both lowland moist forest and dry forest.

See also

List of ecoregions in the United States (WWF)

References

External links

 
Moist
 
Ecoregions of Puerto Rico